Royal Constabulary may refer to:
 Royal Irish Constabulary
 Royal Newfoundland Constabulary
 Royal Parks Constabulary
 Royal Ulster Constabulary